The Filmfare Award for Best Female Debut (previously known as Filmfare Award for Lux  New Face of the Year) is given by Filmfare as part of its annual Filmfare Awards for Hindi films to recognise a performance by a female actor in their debut role. 

The first recipient of the award was Juhi Chawla, who was honored at the 34th Filmfare Awards in the year 1989. Preity Zinta and Ananya Panday are the only actresses who won the award for 2 different films. As of 2021, Priyanka Chopra and Parineeti Chopra are the only cousins to win the award while Sara Ali Khan and Abhimanyu Dassani are the only winners whose parents (Saif Ali Khan and Bhagyashree respectively) have won a Filmfare Best Debut award . 

Juhi Chawla, Preity Zinta, Kareena Kapoor, Priyanka Chopra, Vidya Balan, Kangana Ranaut and Deepika Padukone have all won the Filmfare Award for Best Actress, with Balan winning four times and Padukone winning twice.

Tabu, Kareena Kapoor, Priyanka Chopra, and Kangana Ranaut have all won the Filmfare Award for Best Actress (Critics) (Tabu winning the most at 4 times and Kapoor with 2 wins) and the Filmfare Award for Best Supporting Actress, while Vidya Balan has won the former award once. It was not awarded for this category in the years 1997, 2010 and 2018. The most recent recipient of the award is Sharvari Wagh, who was honored at the 67th Filmfare Awards.

Winners and nominees

1980s

1990s

2000s

2010s

2020s

See also
Filmfare Award for Best Female Debut – South
 Filmfare Awards
 Hindi cinema
 Cinema of India
List of Hindi film actresses

Footnotes

References

External links
 
 Filmfare Nominees and Winners
Filmfare Awards Best Female Debut

Female Debut
Film awards for debut actress